Sornay is a commune in the Saône-et-Loire department in the region of Bourgogne-Franche-Comté in eastern France.

Geography
The river Seille forms the commune's northern border. The Sâne Morte forms part of the commune's southern border.

See also
Communes of the Saône-et-Loire department

References

Communes of Saône-et-Loire